Amaxia juvenis is a moth in the family Erebidae. It was described by William Schaus in 1896. It is found in Mexico.

References

Moths described in 1896
Amaxia
Moths of Central America